Francisco Javier Jusué Garcés (born 30 November 1979 in Tudela, Navarre) is a Spanish retired footballer who played as a central defender.

Football career
On the professional level Jusué played mainly for local giants CA Osasuna, but only appeared in six games with the first team in his first four years as a senior combined, with the Navarrese in the second division. From 2000 to 2002, with the club in La Liga, he ironically played more; he made his debut in the latter competition on 10 February 2001, featuring the full 90 minutes in a 1–2 away loss against Rayo Vallecano.

After a series of loans, mainly in the second level, Jusué was released by Osasuna in the 2005 summer, resuming his career in division three or lower.

Honours
Spain U20
FIFA World Youth Championship: 1999

References

External links

1979 births
Living people
People from Tudela, Navarre
Spanish footballers
Footballers from Navarre
Association football defenders
La Liga players
Segunda División players
Segunda División B players
Tercera División players
CA Osasuna B players
CA Osasuna players
Getafe CF footballers
Recreativo de Huelva players
Cultural Leonesa footballers
UD San Sebastián de los Reyes players
Logroñés CF footballers
CD Izarra footballers
Spain youth international footballers
Spain under-21 international footballers